Northwest School of the Arts is a grade 6 through 12 art magnet school in Charlotte, North Carolina. The school enrolls around 1100 students.

Students audition for acceptance and choose a major. Majors available include performing arts (theatre, technical theatre, musical theatre, ballet, modern dance, tap, jazz, orchestra, choir, and band) and visual arts (painting, drawing, studio, printmaking, photography, fibers, sculpting, ceramics, and other classes which depend on availability and student participation), as well as technical theatre. A communications major was added for the 2010–2011 school year and beyond. NWSA hosts a variety of AP classes, including AP art classes such as AP Studio and AP academics like AP English and AP Biology. Northwest students are active in organizations such as Student Leadership, Diversity Club, Yearbook, Literary Magazine, various honors societies.

Every morning, Northwest School of the Arts begins the day with a "Daily Affirmation". The affirmation was written by long time dancer, choreographer, and faculty member Chandra McCloud.  The affirmation, which follows the Pledge of Allegiance, reads:
"I have a gift.
I am talented.
I am a doer; not a quitter.
I matter to others and to myself.
That is why I will be good to others and good to myself.
I am a leader.
I will walk in my excellence."

Notable alumni
Ashlei Sharpe Chestnut, actress and writer who made her Broadway Debut in the Tony nominated revival of Arthur Miller's The Crucible, and was in the company of the Tony nominated play A Doll's House, Part 2 on Broadway. She also has starred in several Primetime Television shows, a few of her credits include: Homeland, Rap Sh!t, Gotham, and Cruel Summer
Abby Howard, creator of Junior Scientist Power Hour and The Last Halloween
Eva Noblezada, two time Tony Award nominee and actress who currently stars as Eurydice in the Broadway musical Hadestown, and has previously starred as the lead Kim, in Miss Saigon on West End
 Reneé Rapp, actress who played Regina George in the Broadway musical Mean Girls and was the winner of Best Performance by an Actress at the 2018 Jimmy Awards
 Ryan Saranich, jazz fusion saxophonist

References

External links 
 Northwest School of the Arts
 Intermission at NWSA

Schools in Charlotte, North Carolina
Public high schools in North Carolina
Public middle schools in North Carolina
Magnet schools in North Carolina